Elliot's laughingthrush (Trochalopteron elliotii) is a bird species in the family Leiothrichidae.

It is found in central China and far northeastern India.

References

 BirdLife International 2004.  Garrulax elliotii.   2006 IUCN Red List of Threatened Species.   Downloaded on 25 July 2007.

External links
 Elliot's laughingthrush videos on the Internet Bird Collection
Images at ADW

Elliot's laughingthrush
Birds of Central China
Elliot's laughingthrush
Taxonomy articles created by Polbot